Annamaria Prezelj (born July 30, 1997) is a Slovenian basketball player for Botaş SK and the Slovenian national team.

She participated at the EuroBasket Women 2017.

References

1997 births
Living people
Slovenian women's basketball players
Basketball players from Ljubljana
Shooting guards